Sarawut Janthapan (born April 26, 1984), simply known as , is a retired Thai professional footballer and He is the currently assistant manager for Thai League 2 club Uthaithani.

He played for Chonburi FC in the 2008 AFC Champions League group stages.

Honours

Club
Chonburi FC
 Thai Premier League Champions (1) : 2007
 Kor Royal Cup Winners (2) : 2008, 2009

References

External links
 Profile at Goal
 

1984 births
Living people
Sarawut Janthapan
Sarawut Janthapan
Association football midfielders
Sarawut Janthapan
Sarawut Janthapan
Sarawut Janthapan
Sarawut Janthapan
Sarawut Janthapan
Sarawut Janthapan
Sarawut Janthapan